99 Women is a 1969 women in prison film directed by Jesús Franco and starring Maria Schell, Mercedes McCambridge, Maria Rohm, Rosalba Neri, Luciana Paluzzi and Herbert Lom. One of the earliest and most financially successful examples of the genre, it was produced by Harry Alan Towers as an international co-production.

The script was purchased from Robert L. Lippert.

Cast
 Herbert Lom as Governor Santos
 Mercedes McCambridge as Thelma Diaz
 Maria Schell as Leonie Caroll
 Maria Rohm as Marie, #99
 Rosalba Neri as Zoie, #76
 Elisa Montes as Helga, #97
 Luciana Paluzzi as Natalie Mendoza, #98
 Valentina Godoy as Rosalie, #81
 José Maria Blanco as Doctor

Reception
From contemporary reviews, an anonymous reviewer in the Monthly Film Bulletin reviewed a 70-minute version. The reviewer found it to be a "Crude women's prison melodrama" with a "turgid script that rambles coyly on about lesbianism, flogging and the kinky pleasures of the Governor of a men's prison", concluding that the film was "all very tame and unremittingly tedious."

Home media
On February 22, 2005, Blue Underground released an unrated DVD of the English-language director's cut featuring an interview and talent biography with Franco, deleted and alternate scenes, a poster and still gallery and the film's trailer. Alongside this, an X-rated release of the French version, featuring eight minutes of hardcore shots featuring actors not part of the film's main production was also made available.

References

External links 
 

1969 films
Women in prison films
1960s English-language films
English-language German films
English-language Italian films
English-language Spanish films
Films directed by Jesús Franco
Films scored by Bruno Nicolai
Films set in South America